Grant Township is one of fifteen townships in DeKalb County, Indiana. As of the 2010 census, its population was 3,245 and it contained 1,309 housing units.

Geography

Cities and towns
 Auburn (north edge)
 Waterloo (vast majority)

Adjacent townships
 Smithfield Township (north)
 Franklin Township (northeast)
 Wilmington Township (east)
 Union Township (south)
 Richland Township (west)
 Fairfield Township (northwest)

Major highways
  Interstate 69
  U.S. Route 6
  State Road 427

Cemeteries
The township contains three cemeteries: Lutz, Ridge, and Tamarack.

Education
Grant Township residents are eligible to obtain a library card at the Waterloo-Grant Township Public Library in Waterloo.

References
 
 United States Census Bureau cartographic boundary files

External links

 Indiana Township Association
 United Township Association of Indiana

Townships in DeKalb County, Indiana
Townships in Indiana